Chen Rong (born 26 January 2001) is a Chinese footballer currently playing as a midfielder for Liaoning Shenyang Urban, on loan from Dalian Pro.

Club career
Born in Lu'an, Anhui, Chen moved to Spain in 2013 as part of the Wanda Group's Rising Stars programme. In 2019, he joined the youth academy of Atlético Madrid.

On his return to China, Chen signed with Dalian Pro, before going out on loan to the youth development programme, China's under-20 team competing in the China League Two. He scored on his debut in the Chinese FA Cup.

Career statistics

Club
.

Notes

References

External links
 

2001 births
Living people
People from Lu'an
Footballers from Anhui
Chinese footballers
China youth international footballers
Association football midfielders
China League Two players
Atlético Madrid footballers
Dalian Professional F.C. players
Chinese expatriate footballers
Chinese expatriate sportspeople in Spain
Expatriate footballers in Spain